West Brooklyn may refer to:
 West Brooklyn, Nova Scotia, Canada
 West Brooklyn, Illinois, United States
 West Brooklyn (West End Line), now Fort Hamilton Parkway station, a New York City Subway station, United States